The Purple Gang is a 1960 American period crime film directed by Frank McDonald and starring Barry Sullivan, Robert Blake and Jody Lawrance. It portrays the activities of The Purple Gang bootlegging organization in Detroit in the 1920s

Plot
A fictionalized account of The Purple Gang as they smuggled liquor in 1920s Detroit, Michigan.

Cast
 Barry Sullivan as Police Lt. William P. Harley  
 Robert Blake as William Joseph 'Honeyboy' Willard  
 Elaine Edwards as Gladys Harley  
 Marc Cavell as Henry Abel 'Hank' Smith  
 Jody Lawrance as Joan MacNamara  
 Suzanne Ridgway as Daisy 
 Joe Turkel as Eddie Olsen
 Victor Creatore as Al Olsen  
 Paul Dubov as Thomas Allen 'Killer' Burke  
 Ray Boyle as Tom Olsen 
 Kathleen Lockhart as Nun  
 Nestor Paiva as Laurence Orlofsky  
 Lou Krugman as Dr. Riordan  
 Robert Anderson as Police Commissioner  
 Mauritz Hugo as Licovetti  
 James Roosevelt as  Himself in Prologue

Production
The Purple Gang was directed by Frank McDonald and was produced by Lindsley Parsons under the company Lindsley Parsons Productions, Inc. The film details the formation of The Purple Gang and their criminal operations in Detroit, Michigan. It left out that the majority of The Purple Gang was Jewish. The film opened with newsreels and Congressman James Roosevelt, the son of Franklin D. Roosevelt, saying that "despite its entertainment value, the film points out that only by an awakened citizenry can crime be successfully fought." Roosevelt's introduction is followed by a statement that explains the plot of the film. 1930s newsreel footage is interspersed throughout the film. The Los Angeles Evening Citizen News said that the film's narration "adds a convincing documentary flavor to the picture." The narration was provided by Barry Sullivan as his character Bill Harley.

Release
The film was released on January 5, 1960 by Allied Artists. It was released on VHS in 1992 and on DVD in 2011 through the Warner Archive Collection.

Reception
Glenn Erickson of DVD Talk said, "The obvious hook with the true facts of The Purple Gang is the teen angle: in 1959 movie screens were awash with juvenile delinquency pictures. But the script as written sticks with gangster clichés, not adolescent angst." Dave Kehr of The New York Times wrote, "Produced by the cash-strapped independent Allied Artists, the film employs a minimally rendered period setting to provide cover for a more or less frank admiration (at least, up until the last reel) of youth in revolt: teenagers with tommy guns."

References

Bibliography
 Stanfield, Peter. The Cool and the Crazy: Pop Fifties Cinema. Rutgers University Press, 2015.

External links
 
 
 
 

1960 films
1960 crime films
American crime films
Allied Artists films
Films directed by Frank McDonald
Films set in Detroit
Films set in the 1920s
Films scored by Paul Dunlap
The Purple Gang
1960s English-language films
1960s American films